Digimon Tamers, produced by Toei Animation and written by Chiaki J. Konaka as the third series in the Digimon franchise, is centered on the Digimon Tamers, a group of children partnered with a wild Digimon. The characters were designed by Katsuyoshi Nakatsuru and was based on the concept of "a normal elementary school student has a great adventure over the span of a year." Producer Hiromi Seki had wanted the three main characters to be of mixed genders and consist of an immigrant or someone not raised in Japan.

Main characters

Tamers

Takato is a 10 year old student. His parents run their own bakery. Takato plays card games with his friends and draws his own Digimon on paper. After finding a Blue Card, he uses it on the Digivice to create Guilmon. Learning that Digimon are mysteriously appearing in their world, Takato joins the battle. Because Guilmon was a product of his imagination, Takato appears to be empathic with him and thus the two influence each other in every fight. Their bond is augmented when Takato biomerges with Guilmon into Gallantmon. Takato becomes the leader of the organization. He also appeared in Digimon Fusion.
To reflect the normalcy of the characters, Takato was imagined to be a "normal" boy who is "full of curiosity" and "fascinated by monsters and Digimon." To continue the tradition of naming the leading characters in the Digimon series, Takato's name began with the same sound as Tai and Davis' Japanese names, the leading characters from Digimon Adventure and Digimon Adventure 02.

Rika is a 10-year-old champion of the Digimon Card Tournament and known by the title "Digimon Queen." Her relationship with her mother is initially strained, as she is often too busy with work to spend time with her. She is partnered with Renamon. At first, she has a cold and lonely personality and believes in fighting Digimon to become the strongest. However, Takato helps her see that there is more to Digimon beyond fighting. She also appeared in Digimon Fusion.
Rika was designed with a "strong" image and character in an attempt to boost sales for products based on female characters, which traditionally did not perform well in the market. In early stages of her design, Konaka and Nakatsuru based her on Trinity from The Matrix. Fumiko Orikasa was cast to play her due to her clear, strong voice. Konaka decided not to give Rika a father figure to reflect how many Japanese children have grown up without fathers, and he did not intend it to be the cause of her "twisted personality" in spite of the events portrayed in the film Runaway Locomon (which he had no involvement in).

Henry is a 10-year-old student of half-Japanese and half-Hong Kong Chinese descent from Takato's school, though they are not in the same class. In the Japanese version, he is nicknamed  for short when he grows closer to his friends. Because Henry takes care of his younger sister, Suzie, he is patient and mature for his age. He is also experienced with computers and technology because his father is a computer engineer. Henry is partnered with Terriermon, and because he dislikes hurting others, he is reluctant to fight. He is also a Tai Chi practitioner. Throughout the series, he is unaware of his father's connection with the Monster Makers and Hypnos.
Henry became the basis of the proposed non-Japanese or emigrant character Hiromi Seki had wanted for the main cast. Konaka decided to make him half-Chinese and half-Japanese based on the statistics of non-Japanese students in elementary schools. Originally, Henry was written as a foil to Takato, where he would offer "a difference in values" that contrasted with Takato's "child-like beliefs and values."

Partner Digimon

Guilmon is a velociraptor Digimon with a digital hazard symbol on his chest. He is created by Takato, who drew him and was brought to life soon after by the Blue Card which the DigiGnomes secretly placed among his card deck. Guilmon originally has the mentality of a child, unaware of the differences between humans and Digimon, often calling his partner "Takatomon". He stays in a shed of Shinjuku Park, learning to speak normally and develops a better understanding of the world around him. Guilmon possesses a taste for bread, often being distracted by the thought of food. Guilmon has a very keen sense of smell and possesses somewhat of a sixth sense to detect other Digimon in the vicinity, usually going feral in fights due to his virus-type nature. He is also loyal and protective. When Guilmon reverts into Gigimon as a side effect of the Red Card, he says goodbye to Takato. Guilmon also appeared in Digimon Fusion.

Guilmon was created by Chiaki J. Konaka, influenced by Ultraman and Kaiju films. Upon viewing the initial design sketches, he assumed that the character would be roughly the same size as Agumon. However, when he realized that Guilmon would be about the size of a human adult, he realized that "[h]e was nowhere near small enough for a child to hide in his room." Konaka realized that he could tailor the plot of the series to incorporate the problem.

 is the Digivolved form of Guilmon. He is an extremely powerful and large dinosaur Digimon who uses the dragon blades on his arms to cut through almost anything. He appears while fighting Devidramon, though he cannot revert to Guilmon for some time.
 is Guilmon's Ultimate form, an extremely powerful cyborg Digimon who appears while fighting against Mihiramon. His abilities included Pendulum Blades and Atomic Blaster.
 is an alternate Mega form of Guilmon. An evil dragon Digimon caused by Takato's anger against Beelzemon after the latter murders Leomon, while his D-Ark shatters. In this form, the full destructive power of the Digital Hazard is released, causing the Digital World to break up in presence. However, Beelzemon stops Megidramon and he reverts to Guilmon.
 is the actual Mega form of Guilmon. An Exalted Knight Digimon armed with the Gram lance and the Aegis Shield. He is introduced after Takato biomerges with Guilmon. Gallantmon rides on "Grani", a transport vehicle created by "Monster Makers".
 is Gallantmon's final form. He appears after Gallantmon fuses with Grani. In Runaway Locomon, Takato's determination to win causes Galantmon to digivolve back into Crimson Mode who proves to be powerful enough to destroy an entire invading army of Parasimon in just one shot.

Terriermon is a one-horned lop-eared rabbit Digimon with a laid-back personality, often using the word "Momantai" (written as 無問題 or 无问题), a Cantonese phrase meaning "take it easy/no problem". Terriermon was originally a wild Digimon living by the survival of the fittest rules in the Digital World. Henry chooses Terriermon, while playing a video game. When Terriermon digivolves into Gargomon, he goes on a rampage while fighting Gorillamon and loses control. Henry uses a Blue Card to send him out from the computer to the real world. Throughout the series, Henry hid Terriermon from his family, using him like a stuffed toy which Suzie plays with. When Terriermon reverts into Gummymon as a side effect of the Red Card, he says goodbye to Henry.

: Terriermon's champion form, a Beast Digimon resembling a bipedal lop-eared rabbit warrior whose forearms bear a pair of cybernetic Gatling guns that he uses in his attacks, such as the move "Gargo Laser". He can also perform a powerful uppercut attack, "Bunny Pummel". Though having a habit of going on a rampage upon digivolution, Gargomon eventually manages to control himself.
: Terriermon's ultimate form. He is a cyborg Digimon resembling an upright jackrabbit clad in heavy cybernetic armor with high speed. It uses long armored radar-like ears. He appears while fighting against Pajiramon and Vajiramon.
: Terriermon's mega form. A robot Digimon with heavy arsenal and Martial Arts skills. He appears after Henry biomerges with Terriermon, during the fight against Zhuqiaomon. Mega Gargomon uses the Juggernaut program to send the D-Reaper back to the Digital World.

 is a yellow fox Digimon with mentality for a Rookie level. In a fight, she uses ninja-like skills, such as vanishing from view until called and moving at fast speeds. These traits mean that, unlike Guilmon and Terriermon, she can fend for herself when Rika is at school, and never gets into trouble like Guilmon. She has no memory of her life before meeting Rika, whom she first saw as nothing more than a means to become stronger. Her initial exchanges with the other Tamers and their Digimon cause her to question this belief, and Rika's obsession with battle. When Rika and Renamon part ways, they begin to understand each other, and reunite themselves for their apology. Renamon learns that Impmon is selfish, because he is desperate for digivolution. When Renamon reverts into Viximon as a side effect of the Red Card, she says goodbye to Rika. Renamon also appeared in Digimon Fusion.

: Renamon's Champion level. A mythical beast Digimon resembling the legendary kitsune. She appears while fighting Dogukumon.
: An onmyōdō-themed Majin Digimon resembling a bipedal fox sorceress. She fights with various spells and charms to harness the power of magical energy flowing through the universe. Taomon first appeared fighting against Vajramon.
: Renamon's mega form. An armored Shaman Digimon armed with the Vajra Khakkhara and using kudagitsune. She is introduced after Rika biomerges with Renamon.

Other Digimon

Calumon is a small fairy-like Holy Beast Digimon infused with the power to cause digivolution in other Digimon. In the beginning of the series, Calumon thinks of the Real World as a game and the humans as other Digimon. His ears grows larger when he becomes happy and excited, and it allows him to "fly". His forehead bears the symbol which is the polar opposite of the Digi-Hazard. It is from the symbol that Calumon releases the power to catalyze digivolution. Calumon does not digivolve and is the manifested form of digivolution itself.
The development team decided early on in drafting that Calumon would have a unique role and serve as a mascot. Digimon in the Japanese-language incarnation for the series often spoke with affectations and patterns resembling those of human children. Konaka pushed for this not to be the case with Calumon, because of a sentiment that the character "needed to have a strong impact on the audience". Thus, his dialogue often contained the words calu or kuru—pieces of his name—at the end of sentences. When Calumon and Jeri are trapped inside the Kernel Sphere, he helps her avoid depression and protect her from the Chaos with a barrier during the final battle.
The Digimon Sovereigns reveal that Calumon originated as the element of Digivolution - the realized version of "Digi-Entelechies". In order to hide the power from the D-Reaper, they turned the power into the form of a Digimon. At the end of the series, the Sovereigns restore the power to the Digital World, but allow Calumon to continue to live as an ordinary Digimon.
In Digimon World DS, Calumon is a helper in the DigiFarms of the game. Calumon can be added to the player's party (after completing Quest 60), but cannot digivolve. He has a default level of 99 and scan data is given with Beelzemon's data at the end of the game. His trait significantly boosts the EXP all of your Digimon receives after a battle, and has some of the best support moves in the game, including one that fully revives all fallen allies. Calumon appears in merchandise products, including plush toys, posters, and a Tamagotchi game where players need to look after their own pet. Calumon appeared in two albums, Asobo Culuculu and Culu Culu Culumon!, and a third and unfinished one I'm Dreaming of a White Christmas.

Impmon is an imp Digimon. He insults the Tamers and their partners occasionally, saying that no Digimon would ever ally any humans, though he makes friends. He was even prone to insult Calumon, scaring and bullying him on occasion. It is revealed that Impmon lives with Ai and Mako. When they argue, Impmon leaves them and become disdainful to humans. He resented the Tamers and their Digimon even more as the latter manages to digivolve, a power that still eluded him. This did not stop him enjoying himself occasionally with Guilmon and Calumon. Although Renamon was curious about him when she questioned her alliance with Rika, she soon came to view him with contempt, and sometimes mocked him for his actions. After attempting to prove himself by fighting Indramon, Impmon suffers a devastating and painful defeat. He accepts an offer from Chatsuramon, while heading to the Digital World: to be digivolved if he agrees to kill the Tamers and destroy their Digimon when they arrive to retrieve Calumon. Though conflicted, Impmon digivolves into the mega-level fallen angel Digimon . Consumed by his new-found powers and becoming a megalomaniac, he acts on his whim to test his new abilities before attacking the Tamers. When Beelzemon inadvertently murders Leomon, a grief-stricken Jeri intervenes, sparing him instead of letting Gallantmon killed him when he had the chance. As a result of realizing his mistakes, Impmon returns to the Real World. Taking his leave without a goodbye, Impmon forgives himself. Although he is convinced his Tamers have forgotten about him, he soon finds a drawing with a note saying they have gone to their grandmother's. The repentant Impmon realizes that Ai and Mako have become kind to him. After becoming their partner, Impmon reverts into Yaamon, while returning to the Digital World. If Jeri did not stop Gallantmon from killing Beelzemon or Rika and Renamon left Impmon behind in the Digital World, he would have never helped the Tamers defeat one of the D-Reaper's agents and the D-Reaper would have won or Grani did not prevent Impmon's death at the D-Reaper's hand, Suzie and Lopmon would have perished at the hands of the Parasimon swarm.

Recurring characters

Other Tamers

Jeri is a kind and sensitive girl in Takato's class. Her family owns a small tavern in Shibuya, where she works sometimes and helps her father handle drunk customers. She carries around a dog-shaped sock puppet from her half-brother, which she uses to strike-up conversations with. At first glance, she seems to be a sort of perfect child because of her cheerful and happy personality. After Jeri loses her mother, her father cannot resolve as she could not cope having a stepmother. When Beelzemon murders Leomon, a grief-stricken Jeri is attracted and captured by the D-Reaper, who uses the fake one to take her place and infiltrate the Real World. However, thanks to Calumon's presence and Leomon's will, Jeri regains her confidence and Takato rescues her. While Jeri realizes that humans can fulfill their destiny, she forgives Impmon.
Early pre-production notes made by Konaka suggest a female character which likely would become Jeri was named Mishio, who cared for her younger sister like her parents in the red-light district.

Kazu is one of Takato's friends. He is later partnered with Guardromon.

Kenta is one of Takato's friends. He is later partnered with MarineAngemon.

Henry's 7-year-old sister who plays with Terriermon. She is later partnered with Lopmon.
Suzie's scenes with Terriermon were inspired by Nakatsuru's sketches. Originally, Suzie was not planned to become a Tamer, but after Konaka spotted her holding a Digivice at the end of the opening sequence, he decided to include her as one. Konaka had Reiko Yoshida write the episode where Suzie becomes a Tamer because she had written Terriermon and Lopmon's characters in Digimon Adventure 02: Part 1: Digimon Hurricane Touchdown!!/Part 2: Supreme Evolution!! The Golden Digimentals.

Ryo is a 14-year-old boy known as the "Legendary Tamer" with a refreshing personality. He is former champion of the Digimon Card Tournament, who enters the Digital World after defeating Rika in the previous tournament. He is partnered with Cyberdramon, who he often keeps in check with a whip from his D-Power when he goes out of control. Ryo previously appeared in Digimon Adventure and the WonderSwan video games in which he was briefly partnered to Tai Kamiya's Agumon and Davis Motomiya's Veemon before finally getting his own partner Digimon, Monodramon. After Ryo's Monodramon fuses with Milleniummon to become Cyberdramon, the fusion causes Ryo and Cyberdramon to get amnesia and then dimension cross from the Digimon Adventure universe to the Digimon Tamers universe.

Partner Digimon

A lion Digimon. He later becomes Jeri's partner, despite his independent task. He is murdered by Beelzemon and Jeri falls into depression. However, Leomon's spirit appears inside Beelzemon, while he manages to help her regain her confidence.

An android Digimon, who reverts from Andromon in the village of Gekomon. At first, Andromon is injured in the battle and he loses some energy. When Guardromon reverts to Kapurimon as a side effect of the Red Card, he says goodbye to Kazu.

A pixie Digimon dwelling in the Internet Ocean. Though seen even by other marine Digimon, he uses love-based "Kakuna Wave" attack and heals any allies. Appearing among the numerous mega level Digimon to help the Sovereigns fight the D-Reaper, he becomes Kenta's partner. After the D-Reaper is vanquished, MarineAngemon returns to the Digital World.

A three-horned lop-eared rabbit Digimon resembling Terriermon (the only minor differences in her appearance being her brown and pink fur coloration and three horns). As one of the Devas,  is assigned to guard Zhuqiaomon's palace. Unlike the other Devas, Antylamon does not share the disdain of humans. She meets and saves Suzie from Makuramon. After Suzie receives a D-Ark, Antylamon reverts into Lopmon, though Zhuqiaomon attempted to punish her. After Takato saves Jeri, Lopmon reverts into Chocomon and says goodbye to Suzie.

An Ultimate Level Digimon and Ryo's partner. Though being feral in personality, he manages to control himself. Ryo biomerges with Cyberdramon into . It was originally a  that became Ryo's partner in Digimon Tamers: Brave Tamer.

Hypnos

The leader of Hypnos monitoring the activity. He antagonizes the Tamers, but later becomes their ally.

Hypnos Chief Operator and a bakery customer.

Hypnos Operator.

Monster Makers
The Monster Makers (Wild Bunch) are the creators of the original Digimon program in 1984 as students of Palo Alto University. In 2001, Yamaki recruited them. They create the Ark for the children to leave the Digital World, and help them combat the D-Reaper. One of their greatest creations proved to be the entity known as Grani. Among the members include:

Henry and Suzie's father, whose nickname is "Tao". He is originally from Hong Kong. After discovering Henry's involvement with Digimon, Janyu supports him.

Goro, nicknamed "Shibumi", continued on with the Digimon project after it was shut down in 1986, creating the Blue Cards, the D-Powers and developed a way for Digimon to digivolve. He fell into a coma, but woke up in the Digital World.

Rob McCoy

Rob, nicknamed "Dolphin", is Alice's grandfather and the professor at Palo Alto University.

Rai "Curly" Aishuwarya
 
An Indian professor at Miskatonic University.

Babel

An African American theoretical physicist.

Daisy
 
A robotics and software specialist.

Minor characters

Other

An eleven-year-old girl from England with Gothic Lolita fashion style.

A messenger of the Sovereigns. He sacrifices himself to allow the Tamers the ability to bio-merge in the Real World.

 and 
Ai: 
Mako: 
A family of siblings who constantly bicker and fight. The two gave Impmon a horrible impression on humans, believing they only showed an interest in others when it suits them. When Impmon leaves, the siblings began to change their ways by the time he found them at their grandmother's house. Impmon becomes overjoyed, after reuniting with the siblings, who become nicer to him. After the siblings obtain a D-Ark, Impmon becomes their partner.

Family
 Takehiro Matsuki / Takehiro Matsuda (松田 剛弘): Takato's father and a baker. Voiced in the dub by Kirk Thornton.
 Mie Matsuki / Yoshie Matsuda (松田 美枝): Takato's mother and a baker. Voiced in the dub by Philece Sampler.
 Kai Urazoe: Takato's cousin in Okinawa. Voiced in the dub by Brian Donovan in the series and by Yuri Lowenthal in the film.
 Mayumi Wong / Lee Mayumi (李 麻由美 Rī Mayumi): Henry and Suzie's mother. Voiced in the dub by Dorothy Elias-Fahn.
 Richie Wong / Lee Lianjie (李 連杰 Rī Rianchei): Henry and Suzie's older brother.
 Jane Wong / Lee Zhaling (李 嘉玲 Rī Jaarin): Henry and Suzie's older sister. Voiced in the dub by Wendee Lee.
 Rumiko Nonaka / Rumiko Makino (牧野 ルミ子): Rika's mother and a modeler. Voiced in the dub by Mary Elizabeth McGlynn.
 Seiko Hata (秦 聖子): Rika's grandmother. Voiced in the dub by Barbara Goodson.
 Rika's Father: Mentioned in the series, he appeared in "Runaway Locomon". Voiced in the dub by Steven Blum.
 Tadashi Kato (加藤 肇 Katō Hajime): Jeri's father. Voiced in the dub by Bob Papenbrook.
 Shizue Kato (加藤 静江 Katō Shizue): Jeri's stepmother. Voiced in the dub by Bridget Hoffman.
 Masahiko Kato (加藤 昌彦 Katō Masahiko): Jeri's half-brother. Voiced in the dub by Mary Elizabeth McGlynn in the first appearance and by Dina Sherman in other ones.
 Hirofumi Shiota (塩田 博文 Shiota Hirofumi): Kazu's father. Voiced in the dub by Lex Lang.
 Takako Shiota (塩田 貴子 Shiota Takako): Kazu's mother. Voiced in the dub by Michelle Ruff.
 Shunsuke Kitagawa (北川 駿介 Kitagawa Shunsuke): Kenta's father. Voiced in the dub by Dan Lorge.
 Akemi Kitagawa (北川 明美 Kitagawa Akemi): Kenta's mother. Voiced in the dub by Tifanie Christun.

Yodobashi Elementary
 Nami Asaji: one of Takato's teachers. Voiced in the dub by Lara Jill Miller.
 Toshiaki Mori: one of Takato's teachers. Voiced in the dub by R. Martin Klein.
 Mr. Iwamoto: one of Takato's teachers. Voiced in the dub by Bob Papenbrook.
 Seiji Kurosawa: Takato's head teacher. Voiced in the dub by Tom Wyner.

Other Digimon

Twelve Devas
 are servants of Zhuqiaomon, most sharing his disdain for humans, each modeled after an animal from the Chinese zodiac. Some of them entered the human world in search of Calumon and the rest stay at the Digital World. Their only survivor is Antylamon, whom Suzie befriends.

Mihiramon is a giant winged Tiger Digimon. His tail doubles as a powerful weapon that he lashes out to strike like a samurai's sword, seen when he uses his "Samurai Tiger Tail" attack. Mihiramon bio-emerged from the top of the Shinjuku Metropolitan Building during the first activation of the Juggernaut program, sabotaging it and allowing the other Devas to cross into the Real World. He is considered powerful even for an Ultimate; Renamon even suggests that he could have been a Mega before the tamers were able to scan him. He is defeated by WarGrowlmon.

Sandiramon is a snake Digimon. He can generate his "Venom Axe" from his mouth and wield it with his tail. Sandiramon bio-emerges into the subway tunnels of Shinjuku, out speeding the Tamers when they pursue him. After a battle, Growlmon manages to mortally wound him thanks to a Power Modify Card from Kazu. However, Sandiramon laughs before he fades, revealing to the Tamers that the other Devas will avenge him and Mihiramon.

Sinduramon is a rooster Digimon with a super-hard orb-like body armor. He bio-emerged near where Takato and Henry's field trip was camping. Sinduramon was originally small in size until he drained and consumed enough of a nearby city's electrical power to increase his size, while also putting an owl under his spell to serve as his emissary. Eventually, while attempting to absorb more power from a hydroelectric plant, Growlmon knocks Sinduramon into the water and the electricity destroys him.

Pajiramon is a goat centaurette Digimon, whose weapon is a crossbow. She is also capable of emitting earsplitting and destructive ultrasonic blasts by bleating. She accompanied Vajramon into attacking a shopping district. Pajiramon is defeated by Rapidmon.

Vajiramon is an ox centaur Digimon armed with the twin Deva Blades. His warrior-like personality values honor, loathing both cowardice and humans. He accompanied Pajramon in attacking the shopping district where he was seemingly destroyed by Rapidmon after engaging Renamon and developing feelings for her. Vajramon is however revived and later requests an audience with Renamon, taking their meeting to Tokyo Dome where he unknowingly played into divulging the Devas' reasons for being in the human world in his attempt to get her to side with them. After realizing the truth, Vajramon is defeated by Taomon.

Indramon is a bipedal horse Digimon armed with the Horn of Desolation, that is normally strapped on his back until he uses it to generate ultrasonic waves. When he first bio-emerges in the real world, Indramon injures Impmon and leaves in response for the activation of the Juggernaut program. Indramon is defeated by WarGrowlmon.

Kumbhiramon is a rat Digimon encased in a metal orb. His Deva Clone ability enables him to create five duplicates of himself, making up for his rather small size and lack of fighting prowess. He bio-emerges at Shinjuku Park, where he ambushes Jeri and Calumon. However, Kumbhiramon is defeated by Leomon with the help of Gargomon.

Vikaralamon is a pig Digimon and the last Deva to bio-emerge into the Real World. His massive size, extreme durability and great strength enables him to rampage through Shinjuku. Because the attacks of the Tamers' Digimon at their Champion level have no effect on Vikaralamon, Takato, Rika and Henry use each Blue Cards for their partners to achieve ultimate forms. Despite Yamaki's interference, WarGrowlmon defeats Vikaralamon. He was considered the most powerful of the Devas by many of the tamers, and his battle with them revealed the existence of Digimon to the world at large, almost ruining Yamaki's reputation.

Makuramon is monkey Digimon wielding the Primal Orb. He gains a favor with Zhuqiaomon over Catsuramon, though he avoids fighting. He arrives to the human world in the form of a strange boy around the time Indramon bio-emerged. He sets out to find Calumon, discarding the disguise during Vikaralamon's rampage and attacking the Hypnos headquarters at the time when the Juggernaut was activated. Makuramon kidnaps Calumon, but the DigiGnomes free Calumon in the Digital World. While Beelzemon stops Megidramon, he defeats Makuramon and absorbs his data.

Catsuramon is a dog Digimon and Zhuqiaomon's servant. He sends Impmon back to the Digital World and promises him the power to digivolve under Zhuqiaomon's plan. When the Juggernaut program was activated by some people, it caused a storm and he made himself known to the Tamers. After Gallantmon defeats Catsuramon, Beelzemon absorbs his data.

Majiramon is an oriental dragon Digimon who uses the hairs on his body to execute his Flaming Arrowheads attack. He is defeated by Cyberdramon.

Digimon Sovereigns
The  are four powerful Mega-level Digimon who each rule a quarter of the Digital World, each possessing twelve DigiCores. They all dwell on the sixth, highest plain of the Digital World, said to be the first Digimon to reach their highest form and modeled after four symbols. However, when the D-Reaper emerged after years of hibernation, the Sovereigns fell into disarray over the usage of the Catalyst of Shining Digivolution to digivolve every Digimon to fight back against the threat. But knowing that their ability to digivolve is what's causing the D-Reaper to stir convinces Azulongmon to have the DigiGnomes turn the Shining digivolution into Calumon and send him to the human world. Zhuqiaomon declines the decision and sends the Devas to retrieve Calumon. However, Azulongmon convinces Zhuqiaomon to work together. After Ebonwumon and Baihumon join up with their fellow Sovereigns as D-Reaper reacts to Calumon's presence, the Digimon agrees to use his power to give the Sovereigns an army to fight the D-Reaper while he and the Tamers return to their world. In the series finale, the Sovereigns hold the Cable Reaper at bay while MegaGargomon enacts Operation Doodlebug.

Zhuqiaomon

 is the guardian of the Digital World's Southern hemisphere and one of the four Sovereigns, modeled after the Suzaku. Despite his questionable methods and prejudice against humans, he takes his role as defender of the Digital World from any threat serious as he intended to use the Catalyst's power to fight the D-Reaper. But upon learning that Azulongmon sent the Catalyst to the human world in the form of Calumon, Zhuqiaomon sends the twelve Devas to retrieve Calumon and prevent any humans from using him. Zhuqiaomon eventually confronts the Tamers when they arrived to his palace after braving through Digital World, Azulongmon intervening as he and the Tamers convince him that they are not his enemies. Despite his prejudice against humans, Zhuqiaomon joins his fellow Sovereigns in helping the Tamer defeat the D-Reaper by keeping it and its human world counterpart from rejoining.

Azulongmon

 is the guardian of the Digital World's Eastern Hemisphere who is based on the Seiryuu with power over thunder and lightning. He is the most amiable of the Sovereigns, seeing the good in humans and coming to their aid in dire events by convincing Zhuqiaomon to end his fight with the Tamers.

Ebonwumon

 is the guardian of the Digital World's Northern hemisphere and the oldest of the Digimon Sovereigns whose form is modeled after the Genbu with phantasmagoric water techniques. Having a second snake-head, Ebonwumon is gentle-hearted in personality as he looks after Baihumon's domain during his fellow Sovereign's fight with the D-Reaper. In the English dub, each of Ebonwumon's heads speaks with a different accent; one head speaks with a Scottish accent and the other with an Irish brogue.

Baihumon

 is the guardian of the Digital World's Western hemisphere, whose form is modeled after the White Tiger Byakko with power over steel. While Azulongmon stops Zhuqiaomon, Baihumon was attempting to fight the D-Reaper when Ryo arrived. However, Baihumon is exhausted from battling such a relentless foe and falls back to the other Sovereigns in order to join forces with them.

Other Entities

D-Reaper

The , also known as the "True Enemy", is an evil and negative digital lifeform that evolved from the Reaper program that was created in the late 1970s. It would be revealed in side materials that the Reaper was based from the self-defense program utilized by the SIGINT system known as "ECHELON" and was allegedly created to delete the "Creeper" virus that infected ARPANET. The program continues to act on its programing throughout the 1980s to wipe out virtual lifeforms like the ones produced in the Artificial Life research project "Tierra" whenever its target had multiplied beyond a certain amount of memory. The D-Reaper ended up in the rapidly developing Digital World as a pinkish-red grey goo, predating the Digimon and DigiGnomes it would prey on while resetting the Digital World due to its very small Random Access Memory size at the time. But the exponential growth of the network forced the D-Reaper to enter a dormant state within the Net recesses at below the lowest of the Digital World due to its threshold being unchanged, allowing the Digital World to develop pass its Cambrian-like state.

By the 2000s, the network's expansion enabled and allowed a huge influx of data into the Digital World, which the Digimon used to digivolve and change. Despite their system now large enough to handle this load, Azulongmon feared it might awaken the D-Reaper and enlists the DigiGnomes to transform the "Catalyst" program into Calumon and send the Digimon into the human world. But D-Reaper awakened as the Sovereign Digimon attempted to find solutions to stop the D-Reaper before it overwhelms them, Zhuqiaomon sending the Devas to retrieve Calumon to amass an army despite Azulongmon seeing it would complicate matters further.

When the Tamers arrived to the Digital World and fought their way to Zhuqiaomon, the D-Reaper secretly captures Jeri and replaced her with the first of its  "ADR's" or "Agents of the D-Reaper", extensions of the D-Reaper's will created from the assimilated data of those it had consumed in the past. Developing an interest in its creators and adding it into its perimeters, the D-Reaper uses Hynpos's system to manifest its main body, holding its Kernel Sphere which Jeri was being held captive in, into the human world. The D-Reaper then turned the Shinjiku Metropolitan Building into its base of operations while converting the surrounding area into the D-Reaper Zone. Other than its Jeri-Type Agent, the D-Reaper creates more ADRs as drone units that function as extensions of the D-Reaper's conscious to study human behavior while expanding its territory. Unlike the Jeri-Type, the succeeding ADRs operate outside the D-Reaper Zone by a red life line, similar in function to umbilical cords. When these cords are severed, the Agent becomes much weaker and easier to defeat, and weaker Agents will dissipate completely. The D-Reaper mass-produces a new type of ADR until the model becomes obsolete, each ADR numbered while given a codenames based on their appearance and function. The general design aesthetic of the D-Reaper was that of a "Digital creature", exemplified in such details as the jigsaw-like fringes of the Agents, and the optic fiber/telephone wire construction of the Reaper and Mother D-Reaper. Konaka remarked that he was especially fascinated by details like the wings on ADR-02. Aramaki designed the "D-Reaper Zone" which appeared on Earth.

: A spy agent who disguises herself as Jeri, when she suffers with depression, in order to analyze human thoughts. It starts out identical in form to Jeri, lacking the life line of succeeding ADR models, but later transforms into a taller demonic parody of the original. In the end, Jeri-Type was absorbed back into the D-Reaper to serve as Mother D-Reaper's first and last line of defense as both an enlarged face and a giant faceless version of her previous form, she is killed by Gallantmon Crimson Mode. Jeri-Type was designed by Katsuyoshi Nakatsuru.
: An Intelligence Gathering Agent, having no offensive capability but usually appears in large swarms. It was designed by Kenji Watanabe.
: An Antiaircraft Attack Agent. It is the first offensive Agent created by the D-Reaper, and uses its floating extensions to perform remote strikes. It was designed by Kenji Watanabe.
: A Ground Combat Agent that appears in swarms, but it is able to use the wave motion guns on its arms to attack. It was designed by Shinji Aramaki.
: A Grappling Agent. It is a medium-sized offensive unit, which uses its spiral-shaped, stretchable arms for locomotion and hand-to-hand combat. It was designed by Shinji Aramaki. 
: A Military Commander Agent, a medium-sized combat unit of overwhelming power. It was designed by Katsuyoshi Nakatsuru.
: Its name mis-transliteration of Palate due to being covered with mouths that all speak in Jeri's voice, it is a Reconnaissance in force Agent that is functions like a video game's mid-boss. It was designed by Kenji Watanabe.
: A Mother Ship Agent that holds Bubbles-type ADRs in its body, functioning like a video game's mid-boss. It was designed by Kenji Watanabe, who focused the design on a huge size.
: Also known as the "D-Reaper Ball", is a Base Defense Agent. It is formed to protect the Kernel Sphere, later forming the face of the D-Reaper Mother. It was designed by Katsuyoshi Nakatsuru.

As a result, the D-Reaper consumed all of Shinjuku. It was designed by Kenji Watanabe. From this point, in order to complete its control over both worlds, the Mother D-Reaper opens a portal in the Digital World as it is now mostly consumed by its other self. The Digital World's D-Reaper underwent a similar evolution into the  Ability Synthesis Agent, possessing the offensive powers of the Agents that compose it. It was designed by Kenji Watanabe and Katsuyoshi Nakatsuru, who gave it scythes to symbolize that it is a physical manifestation of death. From there, the Mother D-Reaper waits for the Cable Reaper so they can merge and commence the systematic termination of both humans and Digimon. But the Sovereigns hold the Cable Reaper at bay while Takato rescues Jeri before the Tamers proceed with Operation Doodle Bug, using the D-Reaper's portal as an epicenter for Juggernaut to suck in both halves of the D-Reaper and regressed it back into a harmless program. In the English dub, Janyu mentioned that it disappeared forever.

DigiGnomes
A group of digital creatures evolved from the same data like Digimon with the power of wishes. They were created in 1980, making them the first artificial digital creatures. They appeared when the D-Reaper attacked the Digital World in 1990. In 200X when the D-Reaper was slowly resurfacing, Azulongmon had the DigiGnomes transform the Shining Digivolution into Calumon, who entered the Real World. The DigiGnomes were also used by Shibumi to make Blue Cards for the Tamers. When Calumon was captured, the DigiGnomes freed him. Rika and Renamon were the first Tamer team to encounter the DigiGnomes. Takato and Henry meet them in Shibumi's library. The DigiGnomes also appeared when Suzie Wong meets Antylamon. Takato later saw the DigiGnomes flying towards Zhuqiaomon's castle. When the D-Reaper was growing in power, some DigiGnomes sacrificed their lives to release the Shining Digivolution throughout the Digital World, causing all Digimon to Digivolve to their Mega Forms. A DigiGnome later placed MarineAngemon in Kenta's pocket without anyone noticing. Later on during the battle against the D-Reaper, Ai and Mako received a purple D-Power from out of nowhere as a DigiGnome flew over a bus. With the D-Reaper gone, the Tamers' Digimon return to the Digital World, but the portal appears in the tunnel.

Shining Army
Calumon's Shining Digivolution. It allows some Digimon to digivolve and rendezvous with the Sovereigns.

Ark/Grani

The Ark was originally devised by the Monster Makers to extract the tamers from the Digital World, as any portals that had opened in the aftermath of Vikaralamon's rampage had closed before or shortly after the Tamers set out. It was created using the same artificial intelligence program designed for the Digimon. Once it was prepared, it was sent into the Digital World where the Tamers arrive, with instructions to wait forty minutes before heading for the Real World. After Takato and his friends arrive to board the Ark, they return home. Although the Ark was attacked by the D-Reaper, Takato spoke to it in encouragement, and it threw off the program and completed the journey. When the D-Reaper enters the Real World, the Ark gets trapped and loses power. Some time later, the Ark contacts Yamaki, asking for instructions. The program was still functioning and seemed to have grown sentient, like the Digimon. The Monster Makers thus put it to use as a weapon, creating chrome digizoid plating and armed it with a Yugoth Blaster, rechristening it Grani. It quickly developed an attachment to Gallantmon as a steed. Later, a dying Grani fuses with Takato and Guilmon into Gallantmon Crimson Mode.

Behemoth
Beelzemon's motorcycle, which would possess anyone else who rode it, resulting in the rider becoming destructive and evil. Initially, it appeared to be driven by a MetalKoromon and attacking the Mudfrigimon village. However, Guilmon replaced MetalKoromon as the motorcycle's rider for a brief moment, before Leomon intervenes the motorcycle to save Guilmon. Though the motorcycle remains inactive, Beelzemon wields it until Gallantmon destroys it. It also appeared in "Runaway Locomon".

Film-exclusive characters

Battle of Adventurers

Minami is a ten-year-old girl who appeared in Digimon Tamers: Battle of Adventurers. Her father, Takehito, created the "V-Pet" program and has it running on the laptop containing the original one, based on her lost dog Mei.

Seasarmon is Minami's partner. He is the reincarnation of her pet dog "Mei", who sacrifices himself to activate the vaccine program and destroy erase all V-Pets from the world. After Gulfmon's defeat, Minami and her father return home.

 The film’s antagonist, a baphomet-like Digimon that came into being from remnant data from Apocalymon while attacked by Omnimon while attempting to Bio-Emerge into the Real World. Like his predecessor, Mephistomon harbored malice for everything and thus worked to destroy the world. He soon becomes famous for his part in marketing the V-Pet, a digital pet that he modified to cause other Digimon to Bio-Emerge and become his servants. Takahito Uehara, the original creator of the V-Pet, detects Mephistomon’s virus and creates a vaccine program which he implants into the original V-Pet, which manifests as Seasarmon. When Mephistomon finds out about the vaccine, he uses his servants to kidnap Takehito and find out the vaccine's location. Mephistomon discards his guise once learning the vaccine is within Seesarmon, taking the Tamers to an apocalyptic dimension modeled after his intentions for the Real World. After the Tamers defeat him as the vaccine program purges the virus, Mephistomon Digivolves into the dark beast Digimon Gulfmon and overpowers the Tamers until Calumon Digivolves their partners to their ultimate forms to destroy Gulfmon with a powerful team attack.

Runaway Locomon

In "Runaway Locomon", Locomon bio-emerges in the Real World. It appears at Tokyo's train tracks, creating a rift to the Digital World at Ichigaya station. Hypnos and the Tamers work together to stop Locomon. When Parasimon forces Locomon to digivolve into GranLocomon, Takato saves Rika. Parasimon is able to send a signal into the rift before he disappears — this signal allows many other Parasimon to bio-emerge, and they begin destroying the city. The Tamers and their Digimon fight against the swarm, until Gallantmon Crimson Mode defeats them all in a single blow. Afterwards, Locomon returns to the Digital World.

Notes

References

Tamers